James Foster (April 1, 1786 – December 12, 1846) was an early Latter Day Saint leader and one of the early presidents of the Seventy. He took the place of Leonard Rich as one of the seven presidents.

Foster was involved in pioneer work in Missouri before the Later Day Saints were expelled from the area; and he later settled in Jacksonville, Illinois, where he died.

Footnotes

External links
Grampa Bill's G.A. Pages: James Foster

1786 births
1841 deaths
Converts to Mormonism
Latter Day Saints from Illinois
Latter Day Saints from New Hampshire
Leaders in the Church of Christ (Latter Day Saints)
People from Hillsborough County, New Hampshire
Presidents of the Seventy (LDS Church)
Religious leaders from New Hampshire